Najee Mustafaa, birth name Reggie Rutland, (born June 20, 1964) is a former professional American football player who played safety for seven seasons for the Minnesota Vikings, Cleveland Browns, and Oakland Raiders. He played collegiately for the Georgia Tech football team. He set the Vikings' franchise record for longest interception return (97 yards) in 1991 and the Browns' franchise record for the longest interception return (97 yards) in 1993, though both records have since been broken.

References

External links
 

1964 births
Living people
American football cornerbacks
Minnesota Vikings players
Cleveland Browns players
Oakland Raiders players
Georgia Tech Yellow Jackets football players
American Muslims
Sportspeople from Fulton County, Georgia
People from East Point, Georgia